Space Delta 5 (DEL 5) is a United States Space Force unit responsible for preparing, presenting, and fighting assigned and attached forces for the purpose of conducting operational-level command and control (C2) of space forces to achieve theater and global objectives. It provides the majority of the forces and the structure for the Combined Space Operations Center. 
Activated on 24 July 2020, the delta is headquartered at Vandenberg Space Force Base, California. Its current commander is Colonel Phillip A. Verroco.

It was based upon the previous 614th Air Operations Center, the previous 14th Air Force operations center.

Structure

List of commanders

References 

Deltas of the United States Space Force